Bosniaks in  Syria, also known as Bosnians in Syria,  refers to citizens of Syria who are, or descend from, ethnic Bosniak people. They form one of the smaller ethnic minorities in the country.

Much of the Bosniak community have become Arabized; for this reason, they are often counted as "Arab". Indeed, many Bosniaks who adhere to Islam do self-identify as Arabs, however, there are still some who have retained their national identity.

History

In the 19th century, some of the Bosniaks who were expelled from Balkan lands under the new rulers emigrated as refugees to Ottoman Syria.

See also
Bushnak

References

 Syrian
Bosniak diaspora
European diaspora in Syria
Islam in Syria